Dr. Wacław Olszak (29 May 1868 – 11 September 1939) was a Polish physician, activist and politician from the region of Zaolzie, Czechoslovakia. He was a mayor of the town of Karviná for seven years. Ten days after outbreak of World War II he was murdered by Nazis.

Olszak was born in Šenov as a tenth child of a peasant. After elementary school he attended the German gymnasium (high school) in Cieszyn, from which he graduated in 1889. He went to Vienna to study medicine at the University of Vienna. He graduated in 1895. After returning to his region, Olszak started to work as a doctor in Karviná, becoming the first Polish doctor for coal miners in that town. He also worked as a doctor at the château in Fryštát for count Larisch-Mönnich, and as a family doctor for many local German engineers and administration workers. Olszak however, working mostly with poor coal miners and their families, helped to organize a social help for them.

Olszak was a member and co-founder of various Polish organizations in Zaolzie. He was a member of the general committee of Związek Polaków w Czechosłowacji (Association of Poles in Czechoslovakia) and Związek Śląskich Katolików w Czechosłowacji (Association of Silesian Catholics in Czechoslovakia). After World War I, as a member of the Association of Silesian Catholics, he took active part in the work of the National Council of the Duchy of Cieszyn, provisional Polish political body working for joining Cieszyn Silesia to independent Poland.

Olszak was regularly elected to the city council of Karviná and in 1929 became a mayor, beating in the elections Czech candidate Oskar Kučera. On 6 July 1930 he hosted in the town the Czechoslovak president Tomáš G. Masaryk and welcomed him in Polish. President Masaryk later made a speech in both Polish and Czech languages. On 4 July 1936 Olszak contested in next mayoral elections but lost to Czech candidate Antonín Krůta. After the elections Olszak worked again as a general doctor for coal miners, he maintained this position after Poland annexed Zaolzie in October 1938.

On 1 September 1939 World War II started and Wehrmacht entered also Zaolzie region. Dr Olszak was arrested by Nazi authorities on 2 September. On 7 September he was called out to one of local coal mines to a reputed accident. Upon arrival he was seriously beaten by Gestapo and local German coal mining administration. He was transferred to the hospital, where he died on 11 September. Bleeding to the brain was given as a cause of death in the official documents. His funeral was highly restricted by Nazi German authorities who were aware of Olszak's popularity. Although crowds of locals followed the funeral procession, only four people were allowed to enter the cemetery - wife, two sons and priest. He is buried at a cemetery in the Doly (Kopalnie) district of Karviná.

Streets in Cieszyn and Karviná are named after him. His son Wacław became an internationally acclaimed engineer and construction theorist; his son Feliks became a metallurgical engineer.

Footnotes

References 

 

 

1868 births
1939 deaths
People from Šenov
Czechoslovak physicians
Polish politicians
Polish people from Zaolzie
Mayors of places in Czechoslovakia
Polish Roman Catholics
University of Vienna alumni
Czechoslovak civilians killed in World War II
Polish civilians killed in World War II
Polish people executed by Nazi Germany